Everlange (Luxembourgish: Iewerleng, German: Everlingen) is a small town in the commune of Useldange, in western Luxembourg.  , the town has a population of 350.

Redange (canton)
Towns in Luxembourg